Motherland: Fort Salem is an American supernatural drama television series created by Eliot Laurence that premiered on Freeform on March 18, 2020. The series stars Taylor Hickson as Raelle Collar, Jessica Sutton as Tally Craven, and Ashley Nicole Williams as Abigail Bellweather, three witches conscripted into the U.S. Army. In August 2021, the series was renewed for a third and final season which premiered on June 21, 2022, and concluded on August 23, 2022.

Premise
Motherland: Fort Salem follows Raelle Collar, Abigail Bellweather, and Tally Craven, three witches who are conscripted into the U.S. Army. They train in combat magic and use their vocal cords to enact "seeds" or "seed sounds", layering vocal sounds to create powerful spells. The series takes place in a women-dominated world in which the U.S. ended persecution of witches 300 years ago during the Salem witch trials after an agreement known as the Salem Accord. The world finds itself at odds with a terrorist organization known as the Spree, a witch resistance group fighting against the conscription of witches.

Cast and characters

Main

 Taylor Hickson as Raelle Collar, a witch from a minor witch family line who enlists at Fort Salem, but who shows a surprising potential for work. Her mother was killed in combat while her father is revealed to be a civilian, something deeply frowned upon.
 Amalia Holm as Scylla, a second-year cadet at Fort Salem whom Raelle falls for, but who is evasive about her past. It is later revealed her surname is Ramshorn. Her parents were killed for being dodgers, an illegal act of avoiding military conscription.
 Demetria McKinney as Anacostia Quartermaine, a tough drill sergeant at Fort Salem
 Jessica Sutton as Tally Craven, a witch who enthusiastically enlists at Fort Salem despite her mother's opposition due to all of Tally's aunts being previously killed in action
 Ashley Nicole Williams as Abigail Bellweather, a proud enlistee at Fort Salem from the storied Bellweather witch family line
 Lyne Renée as Sarah Alder (seasons 2–3; recurring season 1), the commanding general of the United States' witch armed forces and the leader of Fort Salem. She is hundreds of years old, having negotiated the Salem Accords 300 years ago, but appears to be a woman in her 40s in the present day.

Recurring

 Catherine Lough Haggquist as Petra Bellweather, an ambitious, proud, by-the-book general in the U.S. armed forces as chief intelligence officer and Abigail's mother
 Diana Pavlovska as Willa Collar, Raelle's mother who was reportedly killed in combat before Raelle enlisted
 Hrothgar Mathews as Edwin Collar, Raelle's father
 Annie Jacob as Glory Moffett (season 1), a meek enlistee at Fort Salem and a friend of Tally's
 Sarah Yarkin as Libba Swythe (season 1), a pugnacious enlistee at Fort Salem whose family has a long-standing feud with the Bellweathers
 Sheryl Lee Ralph as Kelly Wade, the United States president and civilian head of the U.S. government, and thus Alder's superior; she and Alder clash over tactics and military operations.
 Kai Bradbury as Gerit Buttonwood (season 1), a young male witch who visits Fort Salem and soon catches Tally's attention
 Emilie Leclerc as Izadora, a scientist, Necro teacher, and officer at Fort Salem
 Tony Giroux as Adil, a member of the nomadic tribe of witches known as the Tarim, who brings his sister Khalida to Fort Salem for treatment when she becomes mortally ill from an infection
 Kylee Brown as Khalida, a member of the nomadic Tarim tribe and Adil's younger sister who is brought to Fort Salem for treatment of an unknown infection that threatens her life
 Victor Webster as Blanton Silver (seasons 2–3), the vice president of the United States of America
 Arlen Aguayo-Stewart as Nicte Batan (seasons 2–3), who is a witch sergeant from Alder's past, and who has a surprising connection to events in the present. Various actresses have played Nicte when she is magically disguised, including Kandyse McClure in the third season.
 Mellany Barrosas as Penelope Silver (seasons 2–3), Vice President Blanton Silver's daughter, who is recently discovered to be a witch
 Ess Hödlmoser as M (seasons 2–3), a coven leader / sergeant at War College who undertakes the next level of training for Raelle, Tally and Abigail.
 Praneet Akilla as Gregorio (season 2; guest, season 3), a prospective match for Abigail
 Bob Frazer as Alban Hearst (seasons 2–3), a high-ranking member of the Camarilla
 Sandra Ferens as Quinn (seasons 2–3), a friend of Willa Collar's from the army, and Raelle's godmother, who lives in the Cession
 Liza Huget as Minerva Bellweather (seasons 2–3), the formidable mother of Petra Bellweather, and Abigail's grandmother
 Luc Roderique as Sterling Woodlot (seasons 2–3), a member of VP Silver's staff and friend and former lover of Anacostia's
 Emilie Ullerup as Kara Brandt (season 3), a wealthy woman who is financing VP Silver's and the Camarilla's efforts to wipe out witches once and for all
 Michael Horse as the Marshal (season 3), the lead witch-hunter in the Cession
 Aaron Douglas as Colonel Jarrett (season 3), of the non-witch military, who is sent by President Silver to "monitor" events at Fort Salem
 Olivia Lucas as Thelma Bearkiller (season 3), a member of the Cession council who is at first skeptical of the claims of the Bellweather unit

Guest
 Jillian Fargey as May Craven, Tally's mother, who doesn't want Tally to join the army (in "Say the Words", "My Witches", "Book Club")
 Nick E. Tarabay as Witchfather, the male head of the witch armed forces (in "A Biddy's Life", "Hail Beltane", "Mother Mycelium")
 Bernadette Beck as Charvel Bellweather, Abigail's cousin who is about to get married (in "Bellweather Season", "Brianna's Favorite Pencil")
 Naiah Cummins as Bridey, a tough soldier that Petra Bellweather assigns as Abigail's bodyguard after a bloody attack on the Bellweathers (in "Up Is Down", "Witchbomb")
 Marci T. House as the Imperatrix, who is in charge of researching and maintaining witches' magical bloodlines (in "A Tiffany")

Episodes

Series overview

Season 1 (2020)

Season 2 (2021)

Season 3 (2022)

Production

Development
Development on the series began in August 2016 under the working title Motherland and on June 5, 2018, a pilot had been ordered. On March 5, 2019, it was announced that Freeform had given the production a straight-to-series order for a first season consisting of ten episodes. The series was created by Eliot Laurence, who was also expected to executive produce alongside Will Ferrell, Adam McKay, Kevin Messick, Maria Maggenti, and Steven Adelson. The pilot was also directed by Adelson. Production companies involved with the series were slated to include Freeform Studios and Gary Sanchez Productions. On May 14, 2019, an official trailer for the series was released. The series premiered on March 18, 2020.

David J. Peterson along with Jessie Sams created the language known as Méníshè, which is spoken on the show by the Tarim, and is described as an "ancient witch language". Laurence and his team knew of Peterson from his previous work on Game of Thrones and hired him to create the language for the show.

On May 19, 2020, Freeform renewed the series for a second season, which premiered on June 22, 2021. On August 23, 2021, Freeform renewed the series for a third and final season, which premiered on June 21, 2022.

Casting
Alongside the initial series announcement, it was reported that Taylor Hickson, Jessica Sutton, Amalia Holm, and Demetria McKinney had been cast in series regular roles. Kelcey Mawema, one of the leads in the original pilot, was recast. On March 28, 2019, it was announced that Ashley Nicole Williams had replaced Kelcey Mawema. On August 9, 2019, it was announced that Bernadette Beck would be guest starring in the series. On September 24, 2019, it was announced that Kai Bradbury would be joining the cast in a recurring role. On January 28, 2020, Sarah Yarkin was cast in a recurring capacity. On May 19, 2020, Lyne Renée was promoted as a series regular for the second season. On May 27, 2021, Victor Webster, Mellany Barros, Praneet Akilla, Ess Hödlmoser and Arlen Aguayo were cast in recurring roles for the second season.

Filming
Filming for the pilot took place in July 2018. Principal photography for the first season began on April 22, 2019, and ended on August 23, 2019, in Vancouver, British Columbia. Filming took place in the Cloverdale area of Surrey, British Columbia, from May 9 to 10, 2019. Filming for the second season began on October 9, 2020, and concluded on April 1, 2021. Filming for the third season began on November 2, 2021, and concluded on April 14, 2022.

International releases 
Internationally, the show airs on Fox8 in Australia, streams on Showmax in South Africa, and is exclusive to BBC Three and BBC iPlayer in the United Kingdom under the title Fort Salem, to avoid confusion with the BBC sitcom Motherland.

 it has been released by Amazon Prime in France, Germany, Italy, and Spain.

In Canada, Sweden, and Norway, Disney+ has the streaming distribution rights to the show.

Music 
The music for the series is scored by Brandon Roberts. The album for the first season was released on March 20, 2020.

Reception

Critical response

On Rotten Tomatoes, the first season has an approval rating of 71% based on reviews from 17 critics, with an average rating of 6.4/10. The website's critical consensus states, "Despite a fine cast and impressive set up, Motherland: Fort Salem ambitious ideas are overwhelmed by the sheer too-muchness of it all." On Metacritic, it has a weighted average score of 49 out of 100, based on reviews from 7 critics, indicating "mixed or average reviews".

Ratings

Season 1

Season 2

Season 3

Accolades

Notes

References

External links 
 
 

2020 American television series debuts
2022 American television series endings
2020s American drama television series
2020s American LGBT-related drama television series
2020s American supernatural television series
American military television series
Alternate history television series
English-language television shows
Freeform (TV channel) original programming
Fiction about the United States Army
Lesbian-related television shows
Television series by Disney–ABC Domestic Television
Television series by Gary Sanchez Productions
Television shows filmed in Vancouver
Witchcraft in television
Television shows set in Massachusetts
Television series about the United States Army